Robert Fitz Randolph Patten (October 11, 1925 – December 29, 2001) was an American film and television actor. He was perhaps best known for playing Lieutenant Jesse Bishop in the 1949 film Twelve O'Clock High. Patten died in December 2001 of cancer at his home in Malibu, California, at the age of 76.

Partial filmography 

Black Gold (1947) - Jockey (uncredited)
The Street with No Name (1948) - Robert Danker (uncredited)
Apartment for Peggy (1948) - Student (uncredited)
When My Baby Smiles at Me (1948) - Sailor (uncredited)
Mother Is a Freshman (1949) - Young Man (uncredited)
Mr. Belvedere Goes to College (1949) - Joe Fisher
It Happens Every Spring (1949) - Cab Driver (uncredited)
Sand (1949) - Boyd
Slattery's Hurricane (1949) - Lieutenant at Desk (uncredited)
I Was a Male War Bride (1949) - Interne (uncredited)
Father Was a Fullback (1949) - Manager (uncredited)
Twelve O'Clock High (1949) - Lieutenant Jesse Bishop
When Willie Comes Marching Home (1950) - Corporal Heckling Bill (uncredited)
Where the Sidewalk Ends (1950) - Medical Examiner (uncredited)
American Guerrilla in the Philippines (1950) - Lovejoy
The Frogmen (1951) - Lt. Klinger (uncredited)
Riot in Cell Block 11 (1954) - Frank
Return from the Sea (1954) - Welch
Unchained (1955) - Johnny Swanson (uncredited)
D-Day the Sixth of June (1956) - Petty Officer (uncredited)
Bells Are Ringing (1960) - Party Guest (uncredited)
Love in a Goldfish Bowl (1961) - Lt. J. G. Marchon
Breakfast at Tiffany's (1961) - Party Guest (uncredited)
A Guide for the Married Man (1967) - Party Guest
Airport (1970) - Captain Benson
Zig Zag (1970) - John Raymond
The Love Machine (1971) - Reporter (uncredited)
Westworld (1973) - Technician
Black Sunday (1977) - Vickers
FM (1978) - Jack Rapp
Personal Best (1982) - Colin Sales

References

External links 

Rotten Tomatoes profile

1925 births
2001 deaths
People from Tacoma, Washington
Male actors from Tacoma, Washington
Male actors from Washington (state)
Deaths from cancer in California
American male film actors
American male television actors
20th-century American male actors
University of Washington alumni